"Giving Up on Love'" is a song written and recorded by English singer Rick Astley. It was produced by Daize Washbourn with Astley. The song was recorded for Astley's second album, Hold Me in Your Arms. The single peaked at number 38 in US Billboard charts. Never released as a single in the UK, this North American-only single was issued just prior to Astley's US tour.

Versions 

"Giving Up on Love" (7" pop mix) – 4:07
"Giving Up on Love" (12" pop extended mix) – 7:18
"Giving Up on Love" (7" R&B mix) – 4:07
"Giving Up on Love" (12" R&B extended mix) – 7:09
"Giving Up on Love" (12" dub mix) – 5:00

Personnel 
 Rick Astley – lead and backing vocals, keyboards, drums 
 Daize Washbourn – keyboards, drums 
 Roddy Matthews – guitars 
 Shirley Lewis – backing vocals 
 Mae McKenna – backing vocals 
 Leroy Osborne – backing vocals 
 Mike Stock – backing vocals

Chart performance

References
Giving Up On Love single at Rickastley.co.uk

1988 songs
1989 singles
RCA Records singles
Rick Astley songs
Songs about heartache
Songs written by Rick Astley